also known in Japan by the portmanteau abbreviation is a series of genre-merging horse-racing and business simulation games originally created by ASCII. The series sold 6 million copies in Japan by 1999.

Gameplay
The ultimate goal of the player in the Derby Stallion games is to win the title of GI (Group I) Racer. To do this, the player must attempt to develop the greatest stock of horses that he can in order to have the greatest chance at each of the weekday and holiday races that compose the 1-year racing schedule of the fictitious "SRA" (an abbreviation of Sonobe Racing Association) group. Between races, the player engages in numerous business simulation, farm simulation, and role-playing activities.

Derby Stallion games have evolved as newer members of the series have been added, allowing players greater and greater control over every aspect of the horse-raising business. As such, the player must now race horses and place racing bets, manage the working of a stables and/or ranch, select different studs and broodmares for breeding, learn to break and train horses, and set up advantageous horse trades or sales, among other duties. Players must also make critical decisions about appropriate ages to race horses, breeds to pursue, and the timing of events to coincide with race dates. As the player improves the stock of his horses, his racing statistics, and his position in the world of the horse business, his Group Ranking increases until he reaches the goal of Group I at which point he has won the game. The games also allow the player to continue playing after the top goal has been met.

Derby Stallion games all feature a single-player mode, however much effort has been put into making the games as versatile as possible for multiplayer capabilities. Multiplayer functions allow players to trade or complete sales between themselves, to set up breeders' agreements, and to race against opponents. To accomplish this, various methods have been used to exchange data from the earliest password code exchange to online connectivity with PCs, Satellaview exchange (via 8MB memory packs and slotted application cartridge), and Randnet service. Other methods of data exchange that have been developed include telephone satellite connections for players using DoCoMo phones.

Series

Reception
Derby Stallion: Best Race topped the Japanese Famitsu sales chart in June 1992.

Derby Stallion III sold 1.2 million copies and Derby Stallion '96 sold 1.1 million copies. According to Weekly Famitsu, the 1997 Derby Stallion for the PlayStation was Japan's third-best-selling game of 1997, with sales of 1.58 million units. Derby Stallion '99 sold 1.1 million copies.

References

ASCII Corporation games
Kadokawa Dwango franchises
Business simulation games
DOS games
FM Towns games
Game Boy Advance games
Japan-exclusive video games
Horse-related video games
Horse racing video games
NEC PC-9801 games
Nintendo 64 games
Nintendo 3DS games
Nintendo DS games
Nintendo Entertainment System games
Nintendo Switch games
PlayStation (console) games
PlayStation 2 games
PlayStation 3 games
PlayStation Portable
Racing video games
Sega Saturn games
Super Nintendo Entertainment System games
Video games scored by Koichi Sugiyama
Video games scored by Manami Matsumae
Video games developed in Japan
Video game franchises
Video game franchises introduced in 1991